Pantelis Pantelidis (23 November 1983 – 18 February 2016) was a Greek singer, songwriter and lyricist. He died on 18 February 2016 in a car crash.

Biography

Born on November 23, 1983, Pantelis Pantelidis grew up in Nea Ionia, a small suburb of Athens.

Pantelidis worked in the Hellenic Navy as a non-commissioned officer, but abandoned the career to pursue his music. Pantelidis was a self-taught musician and became well known through his music videos on YouTube. After his fame hit, Pantelidis continued his career in discography. He released four albums with great commercial success. Pantelidis collaborated with numerous Greek artists such as Vasilis Karras, Despina Vandi and others. He won three awards at the MAD Video Music Awards, an annual award show in Greece. He won his first award in 2013 as "best new artist," 2015 as "best Greek male singer," and "best Greek Male Singer" again in 2016, after his death. His close family and friends accepted the award on his behalf.

Pantelidis died on 18 February 2016 in a car accident on Vouliagmenis Avenue, Athens.

On February 18, 2017, one year after his death, an unpublished demo song was released Karavia Sto Vitho.

On October 27, 2017, Tha Zo, another unpublished song of the artist was released. It was written and composed by Pantelis Pantelidis and sung by Amaryllis. Within a month, it received 3,000,000 views.

On December 1, 2017, Na Se Kala, his final unpublished song was released. Within one month, it had been viewed 6.000.000+ times.

YouTube success 

From a young age, Pantelis Pantelidis began writing his own songs. When filming them, he began sending the videos to close friends and family, who then posted them on YouTube. In 2012, Pantelis released a video singing his original song, Den Tairiazete Sou Lew, accompanied by his self-taught acoustic guitar playing. The video received instant hype and reached over 1 million views in a short period of time. The video led to a contract with a popular Greek Record company. In 2012, his debut album went double-platinum. In the Autumn of 2013, he won the MAD Video Music Award for Best New Artist.

Death 
On 18 February 2016, Pantelidis died in Athens in a car crash. He was 32 years old. There is much speculation however as to who was driving the vehicle. The collision occurred on Vouliagmenis Avenue, a Mercedes W164 ML 63 AMG, just one day before he was set to perform at a well-known Athens night club with Despoina Vandi and Kostas Martakis.

In the car with him were two women, one of them being Mina Arnaouti. The second woman was Froso Kyriakou; both survived with serious injuries. Arnaouti posted photos of the crash afterwards showing a body in the driver's seat.

In later a genetic evaluation, Giorgos Fitsialos, doctor of Molecular Genetics and one of the many experts investigating the case, found in two of the samples taken from the vehicle's steering wheel mixed genetic profiles of at least two persons, one of whom was Pantelis Pantelidis. The case is still being investigated.

After his death, two of his songs reached the #1 spot on the Billboard chart "Greece Digital Songs". The two songs being "Ta Shinia Sou" and "Pino Apo 'Ki Psila Gia Sena". On June 25, Pantelidis' single was released. The single consisted of one unpublished song and one song available on videoclip, though it was planned to be on the CD. The song Thimamai in YouTube reached over 30,000,000 views. On December 14, 2016, Pantelidis' pre-recorded song "Alli Mia Efkeria" was released via artist's official YouTube channel. The video gained over 1.1 million views within the two days of its release. After four weeks, the video reached more than 20,000,000 views.

Discography

Studio albums
Alkoolikes oi Nyxtes (2012)
Ouranio toxo pou tou Lypane dyo Xromata (2013)
Panselinos kai kati A' Meros Eis-Pnoi (2014)
Panselinos kai kati B' Meros Ek-Pnoi (2015)

CD singles
I agapi einai thyella -with Vasilis Karras Paola Foka-(2012)
Gia Ton Idio Anthropo Milame -with Vasilis Karras-(2012)
Tis Kardias mou to grammeno (2015) 
Thimamai (2016)
Alli Mia Efkeria (2016)
Karavia Ston Vytho + Alli mia efkeria (2017)
Kako skyli (Valentino Remix) (2017)
Na 'sai kala  (2017)

Compilations
2 Nea Tragoudia Ginetai+Alkoolikes oi nyxtes (2013)
Panselinos kai kati Eis-pnoi + Ek-pnoi (2015)
Gia panta (Best of) (2016)

Posthumous releases 

The first song after his death was released on June 26, 2016. It is called Thimamai (Θυμάμαι, I remember) and on YouTube it reached 33,000,000+ views.

On December 14, 2016, Alli mia eykeria (Άλλη μια Ευκαιρία, One more chance) was released. A video clip was also created for this song including unpublished footage of Pantelis Pantelidis. The song on YouTube reached 26,000,000+ views.

On February 18, 2017, one year after his death, Karavia Sto Vitho was released and reached 16,000,000+ views within one month. (Currently 17,000,000)

On October 27, 2017, Tha zo (Θα ζω, I'll live) was released, written by Pandelis Pandelidis and sung by Amarrilis. Within one month, the video received 3,500,000+ views.

On December 1, 2017, Na se kala (Να 'σαι καλά, Be well) was release. The video received 8,500,000 views after a month. (Currently 9,000,000)

On May 25, 2018 , the song Pali Pali (Πάλι Πάλι, Again again) was released. 10 days after release the video received 2.000.000+ views. 1 Month after its release it had 8,500,000+ views. (Currently 9,300,000)

On December 20, 2018 , the song Kane ta panta apopse (Κάνε τα πάντα απόψε, Do everything tonight) was released. 5 days after release the video received 500,000+ views. (Currently 4,500,000)

On December 20, 2018 , the song Ax kai na'ksera pou na'sai (Αχ και να ‘ξερα που να ‘σαι, Oh if I just knew where you are) was released. 5 days after release the video received 700.000+ views. (Currently 2,400,000)

Awards

Songs given to other artists
Though Pantelis Pantelidis was a talent in song-writing he did not give away songs to just anybody. He had in plan to share some of his songs but due to his death he only was able to share with the world via other artists the following songs:

Xeirotera by Eleni Xatzidou
Tora sernese by Paola
Diatages by Amarillis
O kainourios erotas sou by Eirini Papadopoulou
Narkopedio I zoi moy by Giannis ploutarxos

Songs to be released
Pantelis Pantelidis wrote many songs. However, most of them are just found on YouTube in live versions or as a guitar version, like the "Den teriazetai sou leo", which made him popular in the first place.

Even though nothing has been announced yet about the following songs, those are the top that are found in more than 1 version on the internet and people many times asked to be found and song either by other singers or remake the original videos if found and cover with music to be released.

Ase me na nioso tin anapnoi sou
Athina
Egina Skia
Ego eimai edo
Irtha ego na ta gamiso ola
Katexomena
Kai egw sta matia sou miden
Ligo xrono zitises
Me eixes mprosta sou
Mixani tou xronou
Monos moy
O alitis sou
O trelos
Prokalese me
Sagineytiki agapi
Simadia sto laimo sou
Sou egine to s'agapo

and more...

References

External links

1983 births
2016 deaths
21st-century Greek male singers
Greek singer-songwriters
Hellenic Navy officers
Male singer-songwriters
Musicians from Athens
Road incident deaths in Greece